Guanyem Catalunya is a political party in Catalonia founded by the former mayor of Badalona, Dolors Sabater.

History
The party was founded on 1 December 2020, with the aim of "exporting municipalism to Parliament" and "carry on the good work done in the municipalities of Badalona, Girona, Ripollet and Cerdanyola del Vallès."  Previously, a similar space called Municipalistas per la República des de Baix was founded, led by Dolors Sabater herself, Carles Escolà (mayor of Cerdanyola) and José María Osuna (mayor of Ripollet).

On 3 December 2020, the CUP proposed to Guanyem a unitary candidacy to run in the 2021 Catalan regional election, and they also made this proposal to the Anticapitalistas and Communists of Catalonia. On 12 December, an agreement was reached between the CUP and Guanyem to run under the same umbrella in the elections. One of the most important points of this agreement is the candidacy for Barcelona, which will be led by Dolors Sabater.

References

Political parties established in 2020
2020 establishments in Catalonia
Political parties in Catalonia
Catalan nationalist parties
Catalan independence movement